The Oceania Weightlifting Championships is the continental weightlifting championships for Oceanian nations, organised by the Oceania Weightlifting Federation (OWF). Since 1993, the event also incorporates the South Pacific Weightlifting Championships.

Editions 

Notes

References

External links 
 oceaniaweightlifting.com

 
Weightlifting competitions
Recurring sporting events established in 1980